David Henríquez may refer to:
 David Henríquez (footballer, born 1977)
 David Henríquez (footballer, born 1998)